Jack Walsh nicknamed "Duck" was an Australian professional rugby league footballer who played in the 1930s, 1940s and 1950s.  He played for South Sydney and Western Suburbs as a prop.

Playing career
Walsh made his first grade debut for Souths against Canterbury-Bankstown in 1937.  In 1939, Walsh played for Souths in the 1939 grand final against Balmain where the club lost heavily by a score of 33–4 at the Sydney Cricket Ground.  

In 1945, Walsh joined Western Suburbs and became captain coach in 1946.  Walsh was a member of their third premiership winning team defeating Balmain 8–5 in the 1948 grand final.  Walsh played two more seasons for Wests before retiring at the end of 1950.

Coaching career
Walsh coached Western Suburbs in 1956 and 1957.  In both his seasons as coach, Wests qualified for the finals.

References

Australian rugby league coaches
Australian rugby league players
New South Wales rugby league team players
Rugby league players from Sydney
Rugby league props
South Sydney Rabbitohs players
Western Suburbs Magpies coaches
Western Suburbs Magpies players
South Sydney Rabbitohs captains